Envy is the debut album by Ambitious Lovers. It was released in 1984 through E.G. Records. The album marked the first entry in what, at one point, was supposed to be a seven-album series on the seven deadly sins.

Production
Arto Lindsay, who grew up in Brazil, incorporates on the album many elements of that country's heritage. Most of the music was written by keyboardist Peter Scherer.

Critical reception
Trouser Press wrote that "Lindsay’s words are tantalizingly oblique, but there’s nothing oblique about his record’s lusty cry for recognition." Maximum Rocknroll called the album "slick and subdued," writing that Lindsey is "one of the few improv dudes who can make you laugh." MusicHound Rock: The Essential Album Guide called it "shocking in its juxtapositions."

Track listing

Sampling
The hook in "Let's Be Adult" is also in the song "Song 4 Mutya (Out of Control)" by Groove Armada.

Personnel 
Ambitious Lovers
Arto Lindsay – vocals, guitar, production
Peter Scherer – Yamaha DX7, Synclavier, synthesizer bass, sampling, production
Additional musicians and production
Martin Bisi – mixing, recording
Reinaldo Fernandes – vocals, repinique
Mark E. Miller – Oberheim DMX, Tom-toms, backing vocals, production
Robert Musso – mastering
David Moss - Voice
Toni Nogueira – surdo, timpani
Claudio Silva – pandeiro
Jorge Silva – repinique
Seth Tillett – art direction
Howie Weinberg – mastering

References 

1984 debut albums
Ambitious Lovers albums
E.G. Records albums